Russell Keiller is a Scottish curler and curling coach. He participated at the 2006 Winter Olympics as a coach of Great Britain women team.

Russell Keiller was appointed by the Board of Directors of British Curling in August 2014.

Teams

Men's

Mixed

Record as a coach of national teams

References

External links
 

Living people

Scottish male curlers
European curling champions
Scottish curling champions
Scottish curling coaches
Year of birth missing (living people)